Dominique Rey (born 1976) is a Canadian photographer. She is from the St. Boniface area of Winnipeg, Manitoba.

Her work is included in the collections of the National Gallery of Canada and the Winnipeg Art Gallery.

References

21st-century Canadian women artists
21st-century Canadian photographers
20th-century Canadian women artists
20th-century Canadian photographers
1976 births
Living people